Herring Bay is a bay in Anne Arundel County in the U.S. state of Maryland. It lies in the mid-Chesapeake Bay along the western shore.

References

Bodies of water of Anne Arundel County, Maryland
Bays of Maryland